The 2015 Mediterranean Beach Games was the first edition of the Mediterranean Beach Games. It was held from 28 August to 6 September 2015 in Pescara, Italy.

Sports

Participating nations
All 24 member nations of the International Committee for the Mediterranean Games competed in this edition of Mediterranean Beach Games.

Medal table
Final medal standings are shown below, information from official website of 2015 Mediterranean Beach Games for 58 events while one bronze sharing in beach wrestling.

Results
https://web.archive.org/web/20190824190922/https://www.mbgpatras2019.gr/pescara2015

Aquathlon

Beach handball

Beach soccer

Beach tennis

Beach volleyball

Beach wrestling

Canoe ocean racing

Finswimming
Men

Women

Mixed

Open water swimming

Rowing beach sprint

Water ski

References

Mediterranean Beach Games
Multi-sport events in Italy
2015 in Italian sport
2015 in multi-sport events
Sport in Pescara
International sports competitions hosted by Italy